Giorgos Mosialos (Greek: Γιώργος Μόσιαλος; born December 27, 1997, in Larissa, Greece) is a Greek professional basketball player who last played for Larisa of the Greek Basket League.

College career
After playing amateur basketball at the Greek local divisions, Mosialos left Greece in order to playe college basketball at Knox College and at Galesburg, Illinois. After two seasons at Knox, he was transferred to Western New Mexico Mustangs, where he stayed until 2020. As a senior, Mosialos averaged 1.9 points per game.

Professional career
After finishing his college career, he returned to Greece and joined Larisa of the Greek Basket League on September 5, 2020.

References

External links
Real GM Profile
Eurobasket.com Profile
foxsports.com Profile

1997 births
Larisa B.C. players
Living people
Basketball players from Larissa
Greek men's basketball players
Knox Prairie Fire men's basketball players
Western New Mexico Mustangs men's basketball players